Brequinar (DuP-785) is a drug that acts as a potent and selective inhibitor of the enzyme dihydroorotate dehydrogenase. It blocks synthesis of pyrimidine based nucleotides in the body and so inhibits cell growth. Brequinar was invented by DuPont Pharmaceuticals in the 1980s. In 2001, Bristol-Myers Squibb acquired DuPont, and in 2017, Clear Creek Bio acquired the rights to brequinar from BMS.

Brequinar has been investigated as an immunosuppressant for preventing rejection after organ transplant and also as an anti-cancer drug, but was not accepted for medical use in either application largely due to its narrow therapeutic dose range and severe side effects when dosed inappropriately. It has been researched both as part of a potential combination therapy for some cancers, or alternatively as an antiparasitic, or antiviral drug. Clear Creek Bio is currently developing brequinar as a potential treatment for COVID-19.

Inhibition of dihydroorotate dehydrogenase activity by brequinar may represent an efficient approach to the elimination of undifferentiated cells for safe PSC‐derived differentiated cells based therapies.

See also 
 Leflunomide - Clinically used DHODH inhibitor
 Methotrexate - the most widely used pyrimidine synthesis inhibitor

References 

Antiviral drugs
Quinolines
Biphenyls
Carboxylic acids
Organofluorides